Gornostajiškės Manor was a former residential manor in Gornostajiškės village, Šalčininkai District Municipality, Lithuania.

References

Manor houses in Lithuania